Dario Rugašević (born 29 January 1991) is a Croatian football player who plays as a left back for Vukovar 1991 in the Croatian Second Football League.

Club career
A product of Cibalia academy, Rugašević joined the first team in the 2009–10 season and had his professional debut on 25 July 2009 in a league match against NK Zadar, and went on to appear in 17 matches for the club in his first professional season.

On 9 August 2017, he signed a contract with Piast Gliwice. After Piast, Rugašević also played for Bosnian Premier League clubs Zrinjski Mostar and Tuzla City.

International career
Rugašević was a Croatia youth international having earned caps with all of the youth teams from with the Croatia under-16 team onwards.

References

External links
Dario Rugašević at Soccerway

1991 births
Living people
Sportspeople from Vinkovci
Association football fullbacks
Croatian footballers
Croatia youth international footballers
Croatia under-21 international footballers
HNK Cibalia players
RNK Split players
CS Gaz Metan Mediaș players
Piast Gliwice players
HŠK Zrinjski Mostar players
FK Tuzla City players
NK Radomlje players
Croatian Football League players
First Football League (Croatia) players
Liga I players
Ekstraklasa players
Premier League of Bosnia and Herzegovina players
Slovenian PrvaLiga players
Expatriate footballers in Romania
Croatian expatriate sportspeople in Romania 
Expatriate footballers in Poland
Croatian expatriate sportspeople in Poland
Expatriate footballers in Bosnia and Herzegovina
Croatian expatriate sportspeople in Bosnia and Herzegovina
Expatriate footballers in Slovenia
Croatian expatriate sportspeople in Slovenia